Coloradoa is a genus of aphids, in the subfamily Aphidinae. There are eight species in this genus.

References 

Sternorrhyncha genera
Macrosiphini